Mahamahopadhayaya Kaviraja Shyamaldas Dadhivadia (1836-1893), popularly referred to as Kaviraja (Hindi:king of poets) Shyamaldas was one of the early writers involved in documenting the history and culture of the Rajasthan region of India.

Authorship

Shyamaldas co-wrote ( with his father Kayamadana Dadhivadia ) the Dipanga Kul Prakash, an extended narrative poem on the Dodia Rajputs of Mewar. Maharana Sajjan Singh, ruler of Udaipur (princely state), assigned Shyamaldas the task of compiling an authentic history of Mewar. Titled Vir Vinod ( Hindi: Heroes' Delight ), this is the earliest known comprehensive history written in Mewar. It reached the public only in 1930 as Maharana Fateh Singh ( Maharana Sajjan Singh's successor) was averse to its publication.

Negotiator and mentor

Shyamaldas was also a confidant of Maharana Sajjan Singh and was entrusted with the delicate negotiations which resulted in a quick end to the Bhil rebellion of 1881. Later, Shyamaldas' pupil, Gaurishankar Hirachand Ojha also became a famed historian and writer.

Honors and awards

Shyamaldas was honored with the degree of Mahamahopadhayaya and conferred with the Kesar-e-Hind ( Lion of India) by the British Government.

References

Further reading

External links
Permalink to Vir Vinod listing in Library of Congress catalog 
University of Chicago Library Catalog 
Mewar ke gaurav-Kaviraj Shyamaldas in Hindi मेवाड़ के गौरव - कविराजा श्यामल दास

19th-century Indian historians
Scholars from Rajasthan
Charan